Edward Haight may refer to:

 Edward Haight (politician) (1817–1885), American politician and businessman
 Edward Meeker Haight (1896–1975), American World War I flying ace